Royal Museum is a common name for official state museums in countries with a monarchy, or which formerly had one.  Royal Museum may refer to:


Belgium 

Royal Museum of the Armed Forces and of Military History, Brussels
Royal Museum for Central Africa, Tervuren
Royal Museum of Fine Arts, Antwerp
Royal Museums of Fine Arts of Belgium, Brussels

Canada 

In Canada the official history and natural history museums of many of the provinces carry the designation "Royal":
Royal Alberta Museum, the provincial museum of Alberta, located in Edmonton
Royal British Columbia Museum, the provincial museum of British Columbia, located in Victoria
Royal Ontario Museum, the provincial museum of Ontario, located in Toronto
Royal Saskatchewan Museum, the provincial museum of Saskatchewan, located in Regina
Royal Tyrrell Museum of Palaeontology, Drumheller, Alberta

United Kingdom 

Royal Museum, Edinburgh, Scotland
Firepower - The Royal Artillery Museum, Woowich, London, England
Royal Air Force Museum, London and Cosford, England
Royal Engineers Museum,  Gillingham, England
Royal Navy Submarine Museum, Gosport, England
Royal Naval Museum, Portsmouth, England
Royal Marines Museum, Portsmouth, England
Royal Green Jackets (Rifles) Museum, Winchester, England
Royal Cornwall Museum, Truro, England
Royal Armouries Museum, Leeds, England
Royal Albert Memorial Museum, Exeter, England
Royal Museum and Art Gallery, Canterbury, England

Other
Istana Negara, Jalan Istana, a former royal palace in Malaysia, now houses the Royal Museum since 2013.
Royal Jewelry Museum, Alexandria, Egypt
Royal Museum (Berlin), known since 1845 as the Altes Museum
Royal Regalia Museum, Brunei

See also 

 national museum
 provincial museum
 Rijksmuseum